Netroddharakaswami Temple (நேத்ரோதாரகாஸ்வாமி கோயில்)  is a Hindu temple located at Panaiyapuram in the Viluppuram district of Tamil Nadu, India. The presiding deity is Shiva and the main idol is a shivalinga and it is classified as a Paadal Petra Sthalam.

History 

It is one of the shrines of the 275 Paadal Petra Sthalams. The present temple was constructed by the Medieval Chola king Rajendra Chola I at the beginning of the 11th century AD in honour of his assistant, Paravai in whose honour, the surrounding village was named as Paravaipuram. However, an older temple is believed to have existed at the place. 

The temple complex has inscriptions by Rajendra Chola I, Rajendra Chola II, Adhirajendra Chola and Kulothunga Chola I.

Significance 

According to Indian archaeologist R. Nagaswamy, the Saivite saint Sambandar had sung praises of the temple.

When decision was taken to widen the National Highway NH45, there were apprehensions that the temple would be demolished. However, the National Highways Authority of India (NHAI) decided to spare the temple and stopped plans to widen the highway.

References

External list 
 

8th-century Hindu temples
11th-century Hindu temples
Hindu temples in Viluppuram district
Padal Petra Stalam